The women's 5000 metres at the 2010 African Championships in Athletics were held on July 29.

Results

External links
Results

5000
5000 metres at the African Championships in Athletics
2010 in women's athletics